Roman Goginashvili (born 23 January 1984) is a retired Georgian footballer.

Career
Goginashvili began his career with FC Dila Gori and FC Lokomotivi Tbilisi. He moved to FC Sheriff Tiraspol in July 2004, and then joined FC Dinamo Brest in January 2006.  After two seasons with Dinamo Brest, with whom he won the Belarusian Cup 2006-07, he joined Shakhtyor Soligorsk.

References

External links
 
 

1984 births
Living people
Footballers from Georgia (country)
Association football midfielders
Expatriate sportspeople from Georgia (country) in Moldova
Expatriate footballers from Georgia (country)
Expatriate footballers in Moldova
Expatriate footballers in Belarus
Expatriate footballers in Azerbaijan
FC Dila Gori players
FC Lokomotivi Tbilisi players
FC Sheriff Tiraspol players
FC Dynamo Brest players
FC Shakhtyor Soligorsk players
AZAL PFK players
Expatriate sportspeople from Georgia (country) in Azerbaijan